
Gmina Kobylin-Borzymy is a rural gmina (administrative district) in Wysokie Mazowieckie County, Podlaskie Voivodeship, in north-eastern Poland.

Villages
Gmina Kobylin-Borzymy contains the villages and settlements of: 
 
 Franki-Dąbrowa
 Franki-Piaski
 Garbowo-Kolonia
 Kierzki
 Kłoski-Młynowięta
 Kłoski-Świgonie
 Kobylin-Borzymy
 Kobylin-Cieszymy
 Kobylin-Kruszewo
 Kobylin-Kuleszki
 Kobylin-Latki
 Kobylin-Pieniążki
 Kobylin-Pogorzałki
 Kropiwnica-Gajki
 Kropiwnica-Racibory
 Kurowo
 Kurowo-Kolonia
 Kurzyny
 Makowo
 Milewo Zabielne
 Mojki
 Nowe Garbowo
 Piszczaty-Kończany
 Piszczaty-Piotrowięta
 Pszczółczyn
 Sikory-Bartkowięta
 Sikory-Bartyczki
 Sikory-Janowięta
 Sikory-Pawłowięta
 Sikory-Piotrowięta
 Sikory-Tomkowięta
 Sikory-Wojciechowięta
 Stare Wnory
 Stypułki-Borki
 Stypułki-Święchy
 Stypułki-Szymany
 Wnory-Kużele
 Wnory-Wandy 
 Zalesie Łabędzkie

Neighbouring gminas
Gmina Kobylin-Borzymy is bordered by the gminas of Choroszcz, Kulesze Kościelne, Rutki, Sokoły, Tykocin and Zawady.

References

Polish official population figures 2006

Kobylin-Borzymy
Gmina Kobylin Borzymy